Leucopogon mollis is a species of flowering plant in the heath family Ericaceae and is endemic to the south-west of Western Australia. The species was first formally described in 1904 by Ernst Georg Pritzel in Botanische Jahrbücher für Systematik, Pflanzengeschichte und Pflanzengeographie from specimens collected on the summit of "Mount Mongerup" in the Stirling Range. The specific epithet (mollis) means "soft".

Leucopogon mollis is found in the Stirling Range National Park in the Esperance Plains bioregion of south-western Western Australia where it grows on rocky slopes. It is listed as "not threatened", by the Government of Western Australia Department of Biodiversity, Conservation and Attractions.

References

mollis
Ericales of Australia
Flora of Western Australia
Plants described in 1904
Taxa named by Ernst Pritzel